The Duchy of Genoa was a country consisting of the territories of the former Republic of Genoa. It was formed when the former territories of the republic were given to the Kingdom of Sardinia in 1815 as a result of the Congress of Vienna, and dissolved after the Perfect Fusion of 1848.

Ligurian people, with their independentistic and republican traditions, never liked their new political status, and riots sometimes exploded in Genoa.

The state used the Italian Lira as its currency, although the Mint of Genoa remained in operation by issuing coins.

After dissolution in 1848, the territories of the former duchy were divided between the departments (later called provinces) of Genoa and Nice.

Administration 
Replacing the French legislation in force, a specially introduced code was put into place, called; The regulation of the S.M. for civil and criminal matters of the Duchy of Genoa., promulgated in 13 May 1815 with the senate of Genoa ordered to register it and enforce it.

An edict in 1822 ruled out that, justice, dependent on the senate of Genoa, was administered by 7 prefecture courts: Genoa, Bobbio, Chiavari, Finale Marina, Novi Ligure, Sarzana and Savona.

In 1833, the Duchy of Genoa was one of the eight general intendencies of the States of the Mainland which were at the same time military divisions. It included the provinces of Genoa, Savona, Cairo Montenotte, Albenga, Finale Marina, Gavi, Bobbio, Chiavari, La Spezia and Sarzana.

See also 
Republic of Genoa
Ligurian Republic
Kingdom of Sardinia
Duchy of Savoy
Savoyard state

References 

Kingdom of Sardinia
History of Genoa
1815 establishments in the Kingdom of Sardinia
1848 disestablishments in the Kingdom of Sardinia